Chromium acetate hydroxide is the coordination complex with the formula [Cr2(OH)3(OAc)3]4. A dark violet solid, it crystallizes with 34 water of crystallization. It is water soluble.

Structure
The complex is a tetramer of binuclear Cr2(OH)3(OAc)3.  The subunits are linked by acetate and hydroxide ligands.  The oxidation state of chromium is III, which explains the stability of the complex since octahedral d3 ions give kinetically robust complexes.  Overall, the complex's structure is unusual compared to other transition metal carboxylate complexes.

See also
 Chromium(II) acetate
 Chromium(III) acetate

References

External links
http://www.chemicalbook.com/ChemicalProductProperty_EN_CB9726110.htm
http://www.chemicalbook.com/CAS%5Cmol%5C39430-51-8.mol
https://web.archive.org/web/20120119193658/http://www.sigmaaldrich.com/catalog/ProductDetail.do?D7=0&N5=SEARCH_CONCAT_PNO%7CBRAND_KEY&N4=318108%7CALDRICH&N25=0&QS=ON&F=SPEC

Chromium(III) compounds
Acetates
Hydroxides
Coordination complexes
Reducing agents
Chromium–oxygen compounds